Roullier is a surname. It is of French origins. Notable people with the surname include:

 Chase Roullier (born 1993), American football player
 Daniel Roullier (born 1935), French billionaire businessman
 Pierre Roullier (born 1954), French flautist and conductor

See also
 Rollier